The Apostolic Vicariate of Luang Prabang is a Latin rite jurisdiction of the Catholic Church in Laos. As an apostolic vicariate, it is a pre-diocesan jurisdiction, entitled to a titular bishop. It is located in northern Laos.

It is exempt, i.e. not part of any ecclesiastical province but directly dependent on the Holy See and its missionary Roman Congregation for the Evangelization of Peoples.

It currently has no cathedral since its former Cathedral of the Immaculate Conception, in Luang Prabang, has been secularized. The vicariate has been vacant since 1975, entrusted to a series of temporary Apostolic administrators.

Statistics 
The vicariate covers 80,425 km² in the northern Laotian civic provinces of Luang Prabang, Xaignabouli, Oudomxai, Phongsali, Louang Namtha and Bokeo.

As of 2014, it pastorally cares for 2,693 Catholics (0.2% of 1,692,000 total) in 8 parishes with one priest and five seminarians.

History 
It was established on March 1, 1963 as Apostolic Vicariate of Luang Prabang with territory split off from the Vicariate Apostolic of Vientiane.

Since the Communist takeover of Laos in 1975 the Catholic Church in the vicariate of Luang Prabang has been strongly suppressed.

Ordinaries

Apostolic Vicars of Luang Prabang
 Lionello Berti, O.M.I. (1963-1968)
 Alessandro Staccioli, O.M.I. (1968-1975), appointed Auxiliary Bishop of Siena–Colle di Val d’Elsa–Montalcino

Apostolic Administrators
 Thomas Nantha (1975-1984), concurrently Apostolic Vicar of Vientiane
 Jean Khamsé Vithavong O.M.I (1984-1999), concurrently Apostolic Vicar of Vientiane
 Father Tito Banchong Thopanhong (1999-present)

See also 
 List of Catholic dioceses in Laos

References

External links 
 Religious freedom in the Democratic People's Republic of Laos (PDF document, in German, English and French)
 GCatholic, with Google satellite photo
 Catholic hierarchy 

Apostolic vicariates
Luang Prabang
Luang Prabang
Roman Catholic dioceses and prelatures established in the 20th century
Christian organizations established in 1963